The 1920 Army Cadets football team represented the United States Military Academy in the 1920 college football season. In their sixth season under head coach Charles Dudley Daly, the Cadets compiled a 7–2 record, shut out five of their nine opponents, and outscored all opponents by a combined total of 314 to 47.  In the annual Army–Navy Game, the Cadets lost to the   The Cadets also defeated Lebanon Valley College  and Bowdoin College  
 
Two players were recognized on the All-America team. Fullback Walter French was selected as a first-team All-American by Football World magazine and as a second-team All-American by Walter Camp and the United Press. Guard Fritz Breidster was selected as a second-team All-American by Walter Eckersall and a third-team player by Walter Camp.

Schedule

References

Army
Army Black Knights football seasons
Army Cadets football